The 2009 season was São Paulo's 80th season since club's existence. For the third year consecutive Tricolor fall in semifinals of Campeonato Paulista, this time losing to rival Corinthians. In Copa Libertadores was defeated in quarterfinals by Cruzeiro after two losses 1–2 (away), 0–2 (home). At the league, the club broke the triumph's sequence of the three previous titles. Ending in the 3rd position took a place in Copa Libertadores. After three and a half, the coach Muricy Ramalho was fired by the fourth consecutive elimination in Libertadores.

Club

Coaching staff

Top scorers
Includes all competitive matches

Disciplinary record

Managers performance

Overall

{|class="wikitable"
|-
|Games played || 67 (21 Campeonato Paulista, 8 Copa Libertadores, 38 Campeonato Brasileiro)
|-
|Games won || 34 (12 Campeonato Paulista, 4 Copa Libertadores, 18 Campeonato Brasileiro)
|-
|Games drawn || 16 (4 Campeonato Paulista, 1 Copa Libertadores, 11 Campeonato Brasileiro)
|-
|Games lost || 17 (5 Campeonato Paulista, 3 Copa Libertadores, 9 Campeonato Brasileiro)
|-
|Goals scored || 102
|-
|Goals conceded || 72
|-
|Goal difference || +30
|-
|Yellow cards || 186
|-
|Red cards || 22
|-
|Worst discipline || Richarlyson (14 , 3 ) 
|-
|Best result || 5–0 (H) v Mirassol – Paulistão – 2009.3.12 
|-
|Worst result || 3–1 (A) v Corinthians – Série A – 2009.6.21 
|-
|Most appearances || Hernanes, Jean, Washington (58 appearances)
|-
|Top scorer || Washington (32 goals)
|-

Official competitions

Campeonato Paulista

Record

Copa Libertadores

Record

Campeonato Brasileiro

Record

Honours

Individuals

References

External links
saopaulofc.net
São Paulo FC

Brazilian football clubs 2009 season
2009